Manson is an unincorporated community in Perry Township, Clinton County, Indiana.  The town is named for Mahlon Dickerson Manson, a general in the American Civil War and Lieutenant Governor of Indiana.

History
Manson was laid out June 30, 1874, by Lucinda Clark, David Clark and Rebecca Clark.  The New Lights had a small church in Manson in the early 20th century.

Geography

References

External links

Unincorporated communities in Clinton County, Indiana
Unincorporated communities in Indiana